The Swedish Athletics Championships is an annual outdoor track and field competition organised by the Swedish Athletics Association, which serves as the national championship for the sport in Sweden.

The event was first held in 1896 and events for women were added to the schedule in 1927. Separate annual championship events are held for cross country running, road running and racewalking events. There is also a Swedish Indoor Athletics Championships.

Events
The competition programme features a total of 40 individual Swedish Championship athletics events, 20 for men and 20 for women. For each of the sexes, there are seven track running events, three obstacle events, four jumps, four throws, one walking event, and one combined track and field event.

Track running
100 metres, 200 metres, 400 metres, 800 metres, 1500 metres, 5000 metres, 10,000 metres
Obstacle events
100 metres hurdles (women only), 110 metres hurdles (men only), 400 metres hurdles, 3000 metres steeplechase
Jumping events
Pole vault, high jump, long jump, triple jump
Throwing events
Shot put, discus throw, javelin throw, hammer throw
Combined events
Decathlon (men only), Heptathlon (women only)
Racewalking
5000 metres race walk (women only), 10,000 metres race walk (men only)

A men's pentathlon featured on the programme from 1971 to 1987. The men's 10,000 metres race walk was held in 1960, but went through periods of being dropped from the programme. A 5000 m walk for men was held from 1970–76.

The women's programme gradually expanded to match the men's. On the track, the 1500 m was added in 1969, the 3000 metres in 1972 and the 10,000 metres in 1985. The 3000 m was replaced with the international standard 5000 m in 1995. Similarly, the women's pentathlon was replaced by the heptathlon in 1980. The 80 metres hurdles was contested until 1969, after which the international standard distance of 100 m hurdles was used. A 400 m hurdles event was introduced in 1970.  The women's field events reached parity with the men's after the addition of triple jump in 1990, and hammer throw and pole vault in 1996. From the period 1969–86 women had two track walking events over 3000 m and 5000 m, with the shorter event being dropped later. The women's steeplechase was the last event to be added to the schedule, with women first competing in a national championship event in 2001.

References

 
Athletics competitions in Sweden
National athletics competitions
Recurring sporting events established in 1896
1896 establishments in Sweden
Athletics